The county of Cheshire, England, has many buildings that have been listed.

Grades I and II*
Grade I listed buildings in Cheshire
Grade II* listed buildings in Cheshire

Listed buildings by parished and non-parished areas

 Listed buildings in Acton, Cheshire
 Listed buildings in Acton Bridge
 Listed buildings in Adlington, Cheshire
 Listed buildings in Agden, Cheshire West and Chester
 Listed buildings in Alderley Edge
 Listed buildings in Aldersey
 Listed buildings in Aldford
 Listed buildings in Allostock
 Listed buildings in Alpraham
 Listed buildings in Alsager
 Listed buildings in Alvanley
 Listed buildings in Anderton with Marbury
 Listed buildings in Antrobus
 Listed buildings in Appleton, Cheshire
 Listed buildings in Ashley, Cheshire
 Listed buildings in Ashton Hayes
 Listed buildings in Aston by Budworth
 Listed buildings in Aston-by-Sutton
 Listed buildings in Aston juxta Mondrum
 Listed buildings in Audlem
 Listed buildings in Austerson
 Listed buildings in Backford
 Listed buildings in Baddiley
 Listed buildings in Baddington
 Listed buildings in Barnton, Cheshire
 Listed buildings in Barrow, Cheshire
 Listed buildings in Barthomley
 Listed buildings in Barton, Cheshire
 Listed buildings in Batherton
 Listed buildings in Beeston, Cheshire
 Listed buildings in Betchton
 Listed buildings in Bickerton, Cheshire
 Listed buildings in Bickley, Cheshire
 Listed buildings in Birchwood
 Listed buildings in Bollington
 Listed buildings in Bosley
 Listed buildings in Bostock
 Listed buildings in Bradley, Cheshire
 Listed buildings in Bradwall
 Listed buildings in Brereton, Cheshire
 Listed buildings in Brindley
 Listed buildings in Broomhall
 Listed buildings in Broxton, Cheshire
 Listed buildings in Bruen Stapleford
 Listed buildings in Buerton, Cheshire West and Chester
 Listed buildings in Buerton, Cheshire East
 Listed buildings in Bulkeley
 Listed buildings in Bunbury, Cheshire
 Listed buildings in Burland
 Listed buildings in Burton (near Tarporley)
 Listed buildings in Burton (near Neston)
 Listed buildings in Burtonwood and Westbrook
 Listed buildings in Burwardsley
 Listed buildings in Byley
 Listed buildings in Calveley
 Listed buildings in Capenhurst
 Listed buildings in Carden, Cheshire
 Listed buildings in Caughall
 Listed buildings in Checkley cum Wrinehill
 Listed buildings in Chelford
 Listed buildings in Chester Castle parish
 Grade II listed buildings in Chester (central)
 Grade II listed buildings in Chester (east)
 Grade II listed buildings in Chester (north and west)
 Grade II listed buildings in Chester (south)
 Listed buildings in Cholmondeley, Cheshire
 Listed buildings in Chorley, Alderley
 Listed buildings in Chorley, Cholmondeley
 Listed buildings in Chorlton, Cheshire West and Chester
 Listed buildings in Chorlton-by-Backford
 Listed buildings in Christleton
 Listed buildings in Church Lawton
 Listed buildings in Church Minshull
 Listed buildings in Church Shocklach
 Listed buildings in Churton by Aldford
 Listed buildings in Churton by Farndon
 Listed buildings in Clotton Hoofield
 Listed buildings in Clutton, Cheshire
 Listed buildings in Coddington, Cheshire
 Listed buildings in Comberbach
 Listed buildings in Congleton
 Listed buildings in Cotton Edmunds
 Listed buildings in Cranage
 Listed buildings in Crewe
 Listed buildings in Crewe Green
 Listed buildings in Croft, Cheshire
 Listed buildings in Crowton
 Listed buildings in Cuddington, Cheshire
 Listed buildings in Culcheth and Glazebury
 Listed buildings in Darnhall
 Listed buildings in Davenham
 Listed buildings in Delamere, Cheshire
 Listed buildings in Disley
 Listed buildings in Dodcott cum Wilkesley
 Listed buildings in Doddington, Cheshire
 Listed buildings in Dodleston
 Listed buildings in Duckington
 Listed buildings in Duddon
 Listed buildings in Dunham on the Hill
 Listed buildings in Dutton, Cheshire
 Listed buildings in Eaton, Cheshire East
 Listed buildings in Eaton, west Cheshire
 Listed buildings in Eccleston, Cheshire
 Listed buildings in Edge, Cheshire
 Listed buildings in Edleston
 Listed buildings in Ellesmere Port
 Listed buildings in Elton, Cheshire
 Listed buildings in Faddiley
 Listed buildings in Farndon, Cheshire
 Listed buildings in Foulk Stapleford
 Listed buildings in Frodsham
 Listed buildings in Gawsworth
 Listed buildings in Golborne Bellow
 Listed buildings in Golborne David
 Listed buildings in Goostrey
 Listed buildings in Grappenhall and Thelwall
 Listed buildings in Great Boughton
 Listed buildings in Great Budworth
 Listed buildings in Great Sankey
 Listed buildings in Great Sutton
 Listed buildings in Great Warford
 Listed buildings in Guilden Sutton
 Listed buildings in Hale, Halton
 Listed buildings in Hampton, Cheshire
 Listed buildings in Handley, Cheshire
 Listed buildings in Hankelow
 Listed buildings in Hapsford
 Listed buildings in Hartford, Cheshire
 Listed buildings in Harthill, Cheshire
 Listed buildings in Haslington
 Listed buildings in Hassall
 Listed buildings in Hatherton, Cheshire
 Listed buildings in Hatton, Warrington
 Listed buildings in Haughton, Cheshire
 Listed buildings in Helsby
 Listed buildings in Henbury, Cheshire
 Listed buildings in Henhull
 Listed buildings in High Legh
 Listed buildings in Higher Hurdsfield
 Listed buildings in Holmes Chapel
 Listed buildings in Hoole Village
 Listed buildings in Hooton, Cheshire
 Listed buildings in Horton-cum-Peel
 Listed buildings in Hough, Cheshire
 Listed buildings in Hulme Walfield
 Listed buildings in Hunsterson
 Listed buildings in Huntington, Cheshire
 Listed buildings in Hurleston
 Listed buildings in Huxley, Cheshire
 Listed buildings in Ince
 Listed buildings in Kelsall
 Listed buildings in Kettleshulme
 Listed buildings in Kingsley, Cheshire
 Listed buildings in Knutsford
 Listed buildings in Lach Dennis
 Listed buildings in Lea Newbold
 Listed buildings in Ledsham, Cheshire
 Listed buildings in Little Bollington
 Listed buildings in Little Budworth
 Listed buildings in Little Leigh
 Listed buildings in Lostock Gralam
 Listed buildings in Lower Kinnerton
 Listed buildings in Lower Withington
 Listed buildings in Lyme Handley
 Listed buildings in Lymm
 Listed buildings in Macclesfield
 Listed buildings in Macclesfield Forest and Wildboarclough
 Listed buildings of Malpas, Cheshire
 Listed buildings in Manley, Cheshire
 Listed buildings in Marbury cum Quoisley
 Listed buildings in Marlston-cum-Lache
 Listed buildings in Marston, Cheshire
 Listed buildings in Marthall
 Listed buildings in Marton, Cheshire
 Listed buildings in Mere, Cheshire
 Listed buildings in Mickle Trafford
 Listed buildings in Middlewich
 Listed buildings in Millington, Cheshire
 Listed buildings in Minshull Vernon
 Listed buildings in Mobberley
 Listed buildings in Mollington, Cheshire
 Listed buildings in Moreton cum Alcumlow
 Listed buildings in Moston, Cheshire East
 Listed buildings in Mottram St Andrew
 Listed buildings in Mouldsworth
 Listed buildings in Moulton, Cheshire
 Listed buildings in Nantwich
 Listed buildings in Neston
 Listed buildings in Nether Alderley
 Listed buildings in Nether Peover
 Listed buildings in Newbold Astbury
 Listed buildings in Newhall, Cheshire
 Listed buildings in Newton-by-Tattenhall
 Listed buildings in Norbury, Cheshire
 Listed buildings in Norley
 Listed buildings in North Rode
 Listed buildings in Northwich
 Listed buildings in Oakmere
 Listed buildings in Odd Rode
 Listed buildings in Ollerton, Cheshire
 Listed buildings in Over Alderley
 Listed buildings in Overton, Malpas
 Listed buildings in Peckforton
 Listed buildings in Penketh
 Listed buildings in Peover Inferior
 Listed buildings in Peover Superior
 Listed buildings in Pickmere
 Listed buildings in Plumley
 Listed buildings in Poole, Cheshire
 Listed buildings in Pott Shrigley
 Listed buildings in Poulton, Cheshire
 Listed buildings in Poulton-with-Fearnhead
 Listed buildings in Poynton with Worth
 Listed buildings in Prestbury, Cheshire
 Listed buildings in Puddington, Cheshire
 Listed buildings in Pulford
 Listed buildings in Rainow
 Listed buildings in Ridley, Cheshire
 Listed buildings in Rixton-with-Glazebrook
 Listed buildings in Rostherne
 Listed buildings in Rowton, Cheshire
 Listed buildings in Rudheath
 Listed buildings in Runcorn (urban area)
 Listed buildings in Runcorn (rural area)
 Listed buildings in Rushton, Cheshire
 Listed buildings in Saighton
 Listed buildings in Sandbach
 Listed buildings in Saughall
 Listed buildings in Shavington cum Gresty
 Listed buildings in Shocklach Oviatt
 Listed buildings in Shotwick
 Listed buildings in Shotwick Park
 Listed buildings in Siddington, Cheshire
 Listed buildings in Smallwood, Cheshire
 Listed buildings in Snelson, Cheshire
 Listed buildings in Somerford Booths
 Listed buildings in Sound, Cheshire
 Listed buildings in Sproston
 Listed buildings in Spurstow
 Listed buildings in Stanthorne
 Listed buildings in Stapeley
 Listed buildings in Stoak
 Listed buildings in Stockton Heath
 Listed buildings in Stoke, Cheshire East
 Listed buildings in Stretton, Cheshire West and Chester
 Listed buildings in Stretton, Warrington
 Listed buildings in Sutton, Cheshire East
 Listed buildings in Sutton, Cheshire West and Chester
 Listed buildings in Swettenham
 Listed buildings in Tabley Inferior
 Listed buildings in Tabley Superior
 Listed buildings in Tarporley
 Listed buildings in Tarvin
 Listed buildings in Tattenhall
 Listed buildings in Tatton, Cheshire
 Listed buildings in Thornton-le-Moors
 Listed buildings in Threapwood
 Listed buildings in Tilston
 Listed buildings in Tilstone Fearnall
 Listed buildings in Tiverton, Cheshire
 Listed buildings in Toft, Cheshire
 Listed buildings in Tushingham cum Grindley
 Listed buildings in Twemlow
 Listed buildings in Upton-by-Chester
 Listed buildings in Utkinton
 Listed buildings in Walgherton
 Listed buildings in Walton, Cheshire
 Listed buildings in Wardle, Cheshire
 Listed buildings in Warmingham
 Listed buildings in Warrington (unparished area)
 Listed buildings in Waverton, Cheshire
 Listed buildings in Weaverham
 Listed buildings in Wervin
 Listed buildings in Weston, Cheshire East
 Listed buildings in Whitegate and Marton
 Listed buildings in Whitley, Cheshire
 Listed buildings in Widnes
 Listed buildings in Wigland
 Listed buildings in Willaston, Cheshire West
 Listed buildings in Willington, Cheshire
 Listed buildings in Wilmslow
 Listed buildings in Wimbolds Trafford
 Listed buildings in Wimboldsley
 Listed buildings in Wincham
 Listed buildings in Wincle
 Listed buildings in Winsford
 Listed buildings in Winwick, Cheshire
 Listed buildings in Wirswall
 Listed buildings in Wistaston
 Listed buildings in Woolston, Cheshire
 Listed buildings in Worleston
 Listed buildings in Wrenbury cum Frith
 Listed buildings in Wybunbury
 Listed buildings in Wychough